The Second Battle of the Isonzo was fought between the armies of the Kingdom of Italy and of Austria-Hungary in the Italian Front in World War I, between 18 July and 3 August 1915.

Overview
After the failure of the First Battle of the Isonzo, two weeks earlier, Luigi Cadorna, commander-in-chief of the Italian forces, decided for a new thrust against the Austro-Hungarian lines with heavier artillery support.

The overall plans of the Italian offensive were barely changed by the outcomes of the previous fight, besides the role of general Frugoni's Second Army, which this time had, on paper, to carry out only demonstrative attacks all over his front. The major role, assigned to the Duke of Aosta's Third Army, was to conquer Mount San Michele and Mount Cosich, cutting the enemy line and opening the way to Gorizia.

General Cadorna's tactics were as simple as they were harsh: after a heavy artillery bombardment his troops were to advance in a frontal assault against the Austro-Hungarian line, overcome the enemy's barbed-wire fences, and take the trenches. The insufficiency of war materiel – from rifles, to artillery shells, to shears to cut barbed wire – nullified the Italians' numerical superiority.

The battle
The Karst Plateau was the site of an exhausting series of hand-to-hand fights involving the Italian Second and Third Armies, with severe casualties on both sides. Bayonets, swords, knives, and various scrap metal and debris were all used in the terrifying melee. The Austro-Hungarian 20th Honvéd Infantry Division lost two-thirds of its effective strength and was routed due to a combination of the successive Italian Army attacks and the unfavorable terrain.

On 25 July the Italians occupied the Cappuccio Wood, a position west of Mount San Michele, which was not very steep but dominated quite a large area including the Austro-Hungarian bridgehead of Gorizia from the South. Mount San Michele was briefly held by Italian forces, but was recaptured during a desperate counterattack by Colonel Richter, who commanded a group of elite regiments.

In the northern section of the front, the Julian Alps, the Italians managed to overrun Mount Batognica over Kobarid (Caporetto), which would have an important strategic value in future battles.

The battle wore down when both sides ran out of ammunition. The total casualties during the three-week battle were about 91,000 men, of which 43,000 Italians and 48,000 Austro-Hungarians.

See also
First Battle of the Isonzo – 23 June 1915 – 7 July 1915
Third Battle of the Isonzo – 18 October 1915 – 3 November 1915
Fourth Battle of the Isonzo – 10 November 1915 – 2 December 1915
Fifth Battle of the Isonzo – 9 March 1916 – 17 March 1916
Sixth Battle of the Isonzo – 6 August 1916 – 17 August 1916
Seventh Battle of the Isonzo – 14 September 1916 – 17 September 1916
Eighth Battle of the Isonzo – 10 October 1916 – 12 October 1916
Ninth Battle of the Isonzo – 1 November 1916 – 4 November 1916
Tenth Battle of the Isonzo – 12 May 1917 – 8 June 1917
Eleventh Battle of the Isonzo – 19 August 1917 – 12 September 1917
Twelfth Battle of the Isonzo – 24 October 1917 – 7 November 1917 also known as the Battle of Caporetto

References

Further reading
Macdonald, John, and Željko Cimprič. Caporetto and the Isonzo Campaign: The Italian Front, 1915-1918. Barnsley, South Yorkshire: Pen & Sword Military, 2011.

External links 
The Second Battle of the Isonzo, 1915 at FirstWorldWar.com
FirstWorldWar.Com: The Battles of the Isonzo, 1915–17
Battlefield Maps: Italian Front
11 battles at the Isonzo
The Walks of Peace in the Soča Region Foundation. The Foundation preserves, restores and presents the historical and cultural heritage of the First World War in the area of the Isonzo Front for the study, tourist and educational purposes.
The Kobarid Museum (in English) 
Društvo Soška Fronta (in Slovenian)
Pro Hereditate – extensive site (in En/It/Sl)

Isonzo 02
Isonzo 02
Isonzo 02
Isonzo 02
the Isonzo
1915 in Italy
1915 in Austria-Hungary
July 1915 events
August 1915 events